The Stimberg-Stadion is a multi-use stadium in Oer-Erkenschwick, Germany. It is currently used mostly for football matches and is the home of SpVgg Erkenschwick. The stadium, built in 1930, has a capacity of 14,380 spectators. The stadium opened in 1934.

References

External links 
 Venue information

Football venues in Germany
Recklinghausen (district)
Sports venues in North Rhine-Westphalia